Paul Berg was a professor of music and specialist in algorithmic composition at the Institute of Sonology at the Royal Conservatory of The Hague. He is the author of the AC Toolbox.

External links
  page at the Royal Conservatoire
  website for the AC Toolbox
  papers and systems by Paul Berg

Dutch composers
Living people
Year of birth missing (living people)
Academic staff of the Royal Conservatory of The Hague
Place of birth missing (living people)